In supersymmetric extension to the Standard Model (SM) of physics, a sfermion is a hypothetical  spin-0 superpartner particle (sparticle) of its associated fermion. Fermions in the SM have spin- and, therefore, sfermions have spin 0.

The name 'sfermion' was formed by the general rule of prefixing an 's' to the name of its superpartner, denoting that it is a scalar particle with spin 0. For instance, the electron's superpartner is the selectron and the top quark's superpartner is the stop squark.

One corollary from supersymmetry is that sparticles have the same gauge numbers as their SM partners. This means that sparticle–particle pairs have the same color charge, weak isospin charge, and hypercharge (and consequently electric charge). Unbroken supersymmetry also implies that sparticle–particle pairs have the same mass. This is evidently not the case, since these sparticles would have already been detected. Thus, sparticles must have different masses from the particle partners and supersymmetry is said to be broken.

Fundamental sfermions

Squarks

Squarks (also quarkinos) are the superpartners of quarks. These include the sup squark, sdown squark, scharm squark, sstrange squark, stop squark, and sbottom squark.

Sleptons
Sleptons are the superpartners of leptons. These include the selectron, smuon, stau, and their corresponding sneutrino flavors.

See also
Minimal Supersymmetric Standard Model (MSSM)

References 

Supersymmetric quantum field theory
Hypothetical elementary particles
Bosons
Subatomic particles with spin 0